Elam Rotem  (born 29 November 1984) is a composer, singer and harpsichordist based in Basel, Switzerland. He is a leading expert in early music, specifically the music of the turn of the 17th-century. He is the founder and director of the group Profeti della Quinta and also established and maintains the award winning website, Early Music Sources.com.

Life and career

Rotem was born in 1984 in Sdot Yam, Israel. During his studies at Kibbutz Kabri High School, he set up a vocal quintet with fellow students. This ensemble went on to become the international ensemble known as "Profeti della Quinta" which now performs regularly throughout Europe, North America, Israel and further abroad. Rotem studied for a bachelor's degree in harpsichord at the Jerusalem Academy of Music and Dance and studied for advanced degrees in basso continuo, improvisation and composition at the Schola Cantorum Basiliensis. He went on to complete his PhD in 2016 through Schola Cantorum Basiliensis in a joint programme with the University of Würzburg, Germany.

Rotem specializes in the musical style of the 16th and 17th centuries in Italy, and his ensemble, Profeti Della Quinta, is known worldwide for their performances of the music of Italian Jewish composer Salomone Rossi, who was the first composer to use the Western-Christian musical language to compose Hebrew prayers and psalms ("The Songs of Solomon", 1623).

Compositions

Rotem has composed major works in the Italian style of the turn of the 17th-century based on biblical texts in the original Hebrew. Hebrew works were composed at that time by the Mantuan composer, Salomone Rossi.

Whilst countless compositions have been written based on biblical texts, Rotem's works are unique, both in his use of the late Renaissance style in the 21st century and in his adherence to the original Hebrew texts.

 Rappresentatione di Giuseppe e i suoi Fratelli (Joseph and his Brethren)
 Musical drama in three acts, composed in the spirit of the early operas. 2014.

 Quia Amore Langueo
 Song of Songs and Dark Biblical Love Tales. 2015.

 The Lamentation of David
 A setting of 2 Samuel 1:17-27. 2020.

Recordings
 Philippe Verdelot, Madrigals for four voices
 Amor, Fortuna e Morte, Madrigals by de Rore, Luzzaschi, Gesualdo and Monteverdi
 The Carlo G Manuscript, virtuoso liturgical music from the early 17th century
 Luzzasco Luzzaschi (c. 1545–1607): madrigals, motets, and instrumental music 
 Elam Rotem / Quia Amore Langueo, Song of Songs and Dark Biblical Love Tales, motets and dramatic scenes composed in the spirit of early 17th-century Italian music
 Orlando di Lasso / Musica Reservata, Secret music for Albrecht V / The penitential psalms by Orlando di Lassus performed in a historical setting
 Elam Rotem / Rappresentatione di Giuseppe e i suoi Fratelli, Joseph and his Brethren, Biblical musical drama in three acts composed by Elam Rotem in the spirit of the early operas
 Il Mantovano Hebreo, Italian madrigals, Hebrew prayers and instrumental music by Salomone Rossi
 Rore, Monteverdi, and Gesualdo, Part of the 2013 Festival CD "Wege zum Barock"
 Hebreo: The Search for Salomone Rossi, a film by Joseph Rochlitz with Profeti Della Quinta (official website)
 Salomone Rossi: 'The Song of Solomon' and instrumental music, Profeti Della Quinta and Ensemble Muscadin

References

External links
 
 Elam Rotem & Profeti della Quinta American-Israel Cultural Foundation

Schola Cantorum Basiliensis alumni
Israeli performers of early music
21st-century Israeli composers
21st-century Israeli male musicians
Israeli harpsichordists
Historicist composers
Israeli male composers
Founders of early music ensembles
Living people
1984 births